The 1983 Montreal Concordes finished the season in 4th place in the East Division with a 5–10–1 record and missed the playoffs.

Preseason

Regular season

Standings

Schedule

Awards and honours

References

External links
Official Site

Montreal Alouettes seasons
1983 Canadian Football League season by team
1980s in Montreal
1983 in Quebec